Gurre Castle was a royal castle situated in North Zealand, Denmark. Its ruins lie on the outskirts of Helsingør, close to the town of Tikøb on lake Gurre Sø at Gurre. The ruins have been excavated and are now restored.

History
The castle was built in the 12th century. Four towers and a perimeter wall were added in the 1350s. It was first mentioned in court chronicles in 1364, when Pope Urban V sent a gift of relics to its chapel.

King Valdemar Atterdag died in the castle in 1375. Many stories, ballads, and poems have been made about Valdemar. The castle is associated with a legend about King Valdemar, his love for his beautiful mistress Tove Lille, who according to tradition stayed for a long time at Gurre Castle, and the resulting jealousy of his Queen Helvig of Schleswig.

Over the centuries, this core saga was enriched by other legends, eventually growing into a national myth of Denmark. The myth was put into poetical form by the Danish novelist and poet Jens Peter Jacobsen (1847–1885). A German translation of his poems forms the text of the cantata Gurre-Lieder by Austrian composer Arnold Schoenberg (1874–1951).

Excavations
A partial excavation of the ruin took place in 1817. In 1835, a major excavation of the ruins took place, during which the remains were surveyed and mapped. Additional research took place in the 1890s. In 1921, the remains of a stone building were exposed. In the years 1936 to 1939, a restoration of the ruin was carried out.

References

Further reading
 

Ruined castles in Denmark
12th-century fortifications
Valdemar IV of Denmark